Tremandra diffusa  is a species of flowering plant in the family Elaeocarpaceae. It is a small shrub with white flowers and green oval shaped leaves.

Description
The pedicel thread-like and sometimes longer than the leaves. The fruit is a hairy, twin capsule. Flowering occurs from September to January.

Taxonomy and naming
Tremandra diffusa was first formally described in 1824 by Augustin Pyramus de Candolle from an unpublished description by Robert Brown and de Candolle's description was published in Prodromus Systematis Naturalis Regni Vegetabilis. The specific epithet (diffusa) is derived from the Latin diffusus  meaning "spread out", "extended" or "diffuse", usually referring to the habit.

Distribution and habitat
The species is found in the south-west corner of Western Australia growing on flatlands, outcrops and road verges in loam, sand and lateritic soil.

References

diffusa
Flora of Australia
Rosids of Western Australia